Bigelow v. Commonwealth of Virginia, 421 U.S. 809 (1975), was a United States Supreme Court case that established First Amendment protection for advertising.

Background 
Court precedents had long considered advertising mere "commercial speech," giving it little, if any, protection under the First Amendment.

In 1972, the American Civil Liberties Union filed a Supreme Court appeal on behalf of a newspaper editor in Charlottesville, Virginia who had published an advertisement for an abortion referral service in New York (where abortion was legal). Virginia charged the editor, Jeffrey C. Bigelow, with violating a state law that made it a crime to encourage abortions via lectures, advertisements, or any other manner. Bigelow was convicted and fined; the Virginia Supreme Court affirmed his conviction, rejecting his First Amendment challenge by pointing to the lowered protections on commercial advertisements.

Roe v. Wade was pending when Bigelow's appeal first reached the Supreme Court, leading the justices to defer action. After Roe was decided, the justices remanded Bigelow to Virginia, but the state court reaffirmed Bigelow's conviction; Bigelow filed a new appeal to the Supreme Court.

Opinion of the Court 
The decision was announced June 16, 1975. Justices William Rehnquist and Byron White cast the only votes to uphold the conviction.  Justice Blackmun wrote the majority opinion, and was joined by Chief Justice Warren E. Burger and Justices Thurgood Marshall, Potter Stewart, William Brennan, William O. Douglas, and Lewis Powell.

Justice Harry Blackmun wrote that the First Amendment "should prevent states from prohibiting advertisements of products or conduct that is clearly legal at the place advertised." The Court also noted the political nature of abortion and its status as a constitutionally protected fundamental right.

Subsequent developments 
Bigelow was used as precedent in a case in the 1975 term of the Court. In Virginia State Board of Pharmacy v. Virginia Citizens Consumer Council, Blackmun struck down a state law that prohibited pharmacists from advertising the prices of prescription drugs. Justice William Rehnquist was the only dissenter.

References

External links 

United States Supreme Court cases
United States commercial speech case law
1975 in United States case law
United States Supreme Court cases of the Burger Court
Legal history of Virginia